Trotta may refer to:

People
Diego Trotta
Fatima Trotta
Ivano Trotta
Liz Trotta
Marcello Trotta
Roberto Trotta
Margarethe von Trotta

Other uses
Trotta (film), a 1971 West German film directed by Johannes Schaaf

See also
Trotter (disambiguation)

Italian-language surnames